Protoneura dunklei is a species of damselfly in the family Protoneuridae. It is found in the Dominican Republic and possibly Haiti. Its natural habitats are subtropical or tropical moist lowland forests and rivers. It is threatened by habitat loss.

References

Sources

Protoneuridae
Insects described in 1990
Taxonomy articles created by Polbot